The 1958 Weston-super-Mare by-election was held on 12 June 1958.   It was held after the Conservative MP, Sir Ian Leslie Orr-Ewing died.  The seat was retained by the Conservative candidate David Webster.

References

By-elections to the Parliament of the United Kingdom in Somerset constituencies
Weston-super-Mare by-election
Weston-super-Mare by-election
Weston-super-Mare by-election
20th century in Somerset